Alexander John Greenwood (17 June 1933 – January 2006) was an English professional footballer who played as a full back in the Football League for Crystal Palace and Darlington.

Career
Born in Fulham, Greenwood played for Ferryhill Athletic, Chelsea, Crystal Palace, Scarborough and Darlington.

References

1933 births
2006 deaths
Footballers from Fulham
English footballers
Association football fullbacks
Ferryhill Athletic F.C. players
Chelsea F.C. players
Crystal Palace F.C. players
Scarborough F.C. players
Darlington F.C. players
English Football League players